Harrison Butker (born July 14, 1995), nicknamed "Butt Kicker" (a play on words on his last name and position), is an American football kicker for the Kansas City Chiefs of the National Football League (NFL). He played college football at Georgia Tech. He is fourth in NFL history in career field goal percentage (minimum 100 attempts) with 88.1. In 2019, he led the NFL in scoring and won  Super Bowl LIV with the Chiefs. In Super Bowl LVII, he kicked the winning field goal with eight seconds left in the game.

Early years
Butker went to The Westminster Schools, where he played on the football team after picking up the sport as a rising sophomore. He broke the school record (at the time) for a field goal of 53 yards.  He was a three-sport athlete in basketball, football, and soccer, winning three state championships in soccer, and, for all four years, the first-chair tuba player for the school's (upperclassman) symphonic band.

College career
Butker played at Georgia Tech from 2013 through 2016 under head coach Paul Johnson. Butker is the all-time leading scorer in school history and was a captain of the team for his senior season. In his collegiate career, he converted 208-of-210 extra point attempts and 43-of-60 field goal attempts.

Professional career

Carolina Panthers 
The Carolina Panthers selected Butker in the seventh round with the 233rd overall pick in the 2017 NFL Draft. He was the third and last kicker selected in 2017. On May 5, 2017, the Panthers signed Butker to a four-year, $2.48 million contract that includes a signing bonus of $83,112. He was waived on September 13, 2017, and was signed to the practice squad the next day.

Kansas City Chiefs

2017 season
On September 26, 2017, Butker was signed by the Kansas City Chiefs off the Panthers' practice squad after Cairo Santos was placed on injured reserve. On October 2, 2017, Butker converted a game-winning field goal in his debut game against the Washington Redskins. In the following game against the Houston Texans, Butker made all five of his field goal attempts and all three extra point tries. In Week 8, he converted five field goals, including a 51-yarder, in a 29–19 win over the Denver Broncos, earning himself AFC Special Teams Player of the Week and AFC Special Teams Player of the Month. In his first month in the NFL he earned two NFL records: Most made field goals in a month for a rookie kicker and the only player to make five field goals in multiple games of rookie season. In Week 16, Butker converted five field goals in a 29-13 win over the Miami Dolphins, earning him AFC Special Teams Player of the Week. Overall, in the 2017 season, he converted all 28 extra point attempts and 38-of-42 field goal attempts. Butker was named as an alternate to the 2018 Pro Bowl. He finished the season tied for fourth in scoring with Chris Boswell with 142 points.

The Chiefs finished with a 10–6 record and qualified for the playoffs in the 2017 season. In the Wild Card Round against the Tennessee Titans, Butker converted three extra points and missed a 48-yard field goal in the 22–21 defeat.

2018 season
In Week 2, Butker converted a career-high six extra points in the 42–37 victory over the Pittsburgh Steelers. Overall, in the 2018 season, he converted 65 of 69 extra point attempts and 24 of 27 field goal attempts.

2019 season

On April 15, 2019, Butker signed his exclusive rights free agent tender with the Chiefs. The tender gave him a one-year contract worth $645,000. On June 13, 2019, he signed a five-year extension worth $20.3 million.

In Week 9 against the Minnesota Vikings, Butker made two extra points and four field goal attempts, including a 44-yard game-winner, in the 26–23 win, earning him AFC Special Teams Player of the Week. On December 5, Butker was named the AFC Special Teams Player of the Month for his play in November.  Butker led the NFL in regular season field goals with 34 completed field goals. He finished the regular season with 45-of-48 extra points converted and 34-of-38 field goals converted.

During the playoffs, Butker made one field goal and went 11-for-12 in extra point attempts. In the Chiefs 31–20 Super Bowl LIV win over the San Francisco 49ers, Butker converted all four extra point attempts and his only field goal attempt, a 31-yarder in the second quarter.

2020 season
In the Chiefs' Week 2 game against the Los Angeles Chargers, Butker made all three field goal attempts he had in the game, including a franchise record tying 58-yarder, a game tying 30-yard field goal as time expired in regulation, and the game winning and franchise record tying 58-yard field goal to win 23–20 in overtime. The longest field goal record was broken in 2022 while Butker was injured. For his performance, he was named AFC Special Teams Player of the Week. After his fifth missed extra point of the season in a Week 7 game against the Denver Broncos, Butker set a career high for missed extra points in a season despite only attempting 24 extra points up to that point. He finished the 2020 season converting 25-for-27 field-goal attempts and 48-for-54 on extra-point attempts. In Super Bowl LV, Butker scored all of the Chiefs' 9 points in the loss to the Tampa Bay Buccaneers.

2021 season
Butker was placed on the Reserve/COVID-19 list on December 20, 2021 after testing positive for COVID-19. Due to the NFL's COVID-19 protocols, he missed the Chiefs' Week 16 game against the Pittsburgh Steelers. It was the first game of his career he missed. He was activated on December 29, 2021. In the 2021 season, Butker appeared in 16 games and converted 47-of-49 extra point attempts and 25-of-28 field goal attempts.

In the Divisional Round against the Buffalo Bills, he converted a 49-yard game-tying field goal in regulation to force overtime in the 42–36 victory.

2022 season
Despite suffering an ankle injury in the game, Butker made a 51-yard field goal and all four extra point attempts in the Chiefs' Week 1 win over the Arizona Cardinals. The day before the Chiefs’ Week 2 game against the Los Angeles Chargers, he was ruled out due to the ankle injury. He was inactive for the Chiefs next four games. In his first game back from the injury against the Buffalo Bills, he broke the Chiefs' franchise record for longest field goal for the second time (his previous record of 58 had been broken while he was injured) with a 62 yard field goal. It was the 15th field goal in NFL history 62 yards or longer. In his first five games after returning from injury, he missed an extra point or a field goal in each of those games, the longest such streak of his career. He ended the streak making all three field goal attempts and all three extra point attempts in week 11 against the Los Angeles Chargers. In the AFC Championship Game, Butker hit the game winning field goal to defeat the Cincinnati Bengals 23-20 to send the Chiefs to Super Bowl LVII. In the Super Bowl, Butker missed a field goal in the first quarter but hit the game winning field goal in the 4th quarter to give the Chiefs a 38-35 victory over the Philadelphia Eagles giving the Chiefs their 3rd Super Bowl victory in franchise history and 2nd in 4 years.

NFL career statistics

NFL record
 Field goals made by a rookie: 38

Chiefs franchise records
 Field goals made, season: 38 (2017)
 Field goals attempted by a rookie: 42
 Points by a rookie: 142
 Points by a kicker, season: 142 (2017)
 Longest field goal: 62 yards (2022)

Personal life
Butker married his highschool sweetheart, Isabelle, in 2018; They have two children: James Augustine Butker, born January 27, 2019, and Bernadette Butker.

He is a devout Catholic. Butker has publicly spoken out against Traditionis custodes, saying that he felt that he and other tradition-oriented Catholics were "persecuted" in the Church. 

In 2022, Butker supported the Kansas Value Them Both Amendment, which would have overridden a 2019 Kansas Supreme Court ruling that the Kansas constitution guarantees a right to abortion.

References

External links

 Kansas City Chiefs bio
 Georgia Tech Yellow Jackets bio
 

1995 births
Living people
Players of American football from Georgia (U.S. state)
Sportspeople from DeKalb County, Georgia
People from Decatur, Georgia
American football placekickers
Georgia Tech Yellow Jackets football players
Carolina Panthers players
Catholics from Georgia (U.S. state)
Kansas City Chiefs players
The Westminster Schools alumni
American Roman Catholics
American traditionalist Catholics